The Pennsylvania Railroad class HH1s/Y3s are four-cylinder compound articulated locomotives that consisted of only just six examples of ex-Norfolk and Western Railway Y3 class 2-8-8-2 (Whyte notation) wheel arrangement. These 2-8-8-2 steam locomotives were similar to the Norfolk & Western Class Y3 2-8-8-2s but with some minor PRR Alterations on them, such as the keystone number plate that was mounted centrally on the small smokebox door and had fitted a little shelter known as a "Doghouse" onto the tender of the locomotive.

History
The HH1's roots trace back to the Norfolk & Western Railway, where they had once been in charge of general merchandise freight traffic as heavy haulers and subsequently helper service as bankers.

The Pennsylvania Railroad bought six of the N&W class Y3s in 1943 and designated their 2-8-8-2s as the "HH1". They were used in general freight traffic and helper service on the Pennsylvania Railroad similar to their lives on the Norfolk & Western.

These 2-8-8-2 Steam locomotives were generally found in the west of Altoona, Pennsylvania.

Fate 
But Shockingly enough, their careers on the Pennsylvania Railroad were eventually cut short, due to Pennsylvania Railroad's Class J1 2-10-4 Texas type locomotives, and by 1951, all six of them had been retired from active service and they were all sadly broken up for scrap.

Norfolk and Western Railway locomotives
HH1
Standard gauge locomotives of the United States
Steam locomotives of the United States